Alla Ayodhya Rami Reddy is an Indian politician. He was elected to the Rajya Sabha, upper house of the Parliament of India from Andhra Pradesh in the 2020 Rajyasabha elections as a member of the YSR Congress Party.

Personal life
Alla Ayodhya Rami Reddy hailed from Guntur district. Born on August 12, 1964 in Pedakakani to Alla Dasaratha Rami Reddy and Veera Raghavamma. Mangalagiri MLA Alla Rama Krishna Reddy is his brother.

He completed his primary education at Pedakakani in Guntur district. He studied in Bapuji High School in Guntur city up to the tenth class. He studied Intermediate in Reddy College in Narasaraopet in Guntur district.

He completed B Tech (civil) in Karnataka and M Tech (Civil) in Osmania University in Hyderabad. He started his career as a civil engineer in 1984. He is married to Alla Dakshayani.

Business career
He Founded Ramky Group of Companies He has a net worth of US$350 Million and second richest rajya sabha member in the Indian Parliament.

Political career
Alla Ayodhya Rami Reddy Joined YSR Congress Party In February 2014 And Contested As A Member Of Parliament in 2014 General Election From Narasaraopet.He Lost To Rayapati Sambasiva Rao Of Telugu Desam Party.

In 2020 May he was elected as a Member of the Rajya Sabha From YSR Congress Party.

References

Living people
YSR Congress Party politicians
Rajya Sabha members from Andhra Pradesh
1964 births